The 2012–13 Omaha Mavericks men's basketball team represented the University of Nebraska at Omaha during the 2012–13 NCAA Division I men's basketball season. The Mavericks, led by eighth year head coach Derrin Hansen, played their home games at the Ralston Arena and were members of The Summit League. As part of their transition from Division II to Division I, the Mavericks were not eligible for The Summit League tournament or other postseason play. They finished the season 11–20, 6–10 in The Summit League play to finish in sixth place.

Roster

Schedule

|-
!colspan=9 style=| Exhibition

References

Omaha Mavericks men's basketball seasons
Omaha
Omaha Mavericks men's basketball team
Omaha Mavericks men's basketball team